The Local Section of the American Chemical Society has awarded the Herty Medal since 1933 in honor of Charles Herty.
The medallion is solid gold and is inscribed with the words "pro scientia et patria - Herty 1933."
The Latin phrase translates roughly as "for science and country".

This yearly award recognizes outstanding chemists who have significantly contributed to their chosen fields. All chemists in academic, government, or industrial laboratories who have been residing in the southeastern United States for at least 10 years are eligible. (For this purpose Southeastern United States is defined as the union of the following states: Virginia, West Virginia, Kentucky, Tennessee, Mississippi, Louisiana, Alabama, Georgia, Florida, North Carolina, and South Carolina.)

As of 2019, 85 Herty Medalists have been honored. The 75th Herty Award was commemorated with a special celebration that included a special luncheon at the Coca-Cola Headquarters honoring over 10 Herty Medalists, a Graduate Student Symposium at Georgia Tech with several Medalists as speakers, Future Medalists Symposia at local high schools, and the first Herty Medal Undergraduate Research Symposium (HMURS). Notably, Charles Herty was awarded the second Herty Medal in 1934.

Recipients

See also

 List of chemistry awards

References

Awards of the American Chemical Society